Alton Alexis (born November 16, 1957) is a former professional gridiron football wide receiver who played for the Cincinnati Bengals of the National Football League (NFL) in 1980. He also played 18 games with the Calgary Stampeders of the Canadian Football League (CFL) from 1981 to 1982. Alexis scored five touchdowns with the Stampeders with 30 catches for 535 yards.

Alexis played in 1984 and 1985 with the Jacksonville Bulls of the USFL.

In 2016 Alexis was convicted of bankruptcy fraud and sentenced to 16 months in federal prison.

References

External links 
Pro-Football-Reference

1957 births
People from New Iberia, Louisiana
Players of American football from Louisiana
American football wide receivers
Tulane Green Wave football players
Cincinnati Bengals players
Calgary Stampeders players
Jacksonville Bulls players
Living people